Daniel Wass (born 31 May 1989) is a Danish professional footballer who plays for Danish Superliga club Brøndby and the Denmark national team. He is capable of playing as a midfielder and full-back.

Early years
During the majority of his childhood, Wass played for Copenhagen-suburb club BK Avarta, but in 2006, he was scouted by Brøndby and promptly switched clubs. After a year of playing for youth teams within the club, he joined the first team.

Club career

Brøndby

Wass made his debut for  Danish Superliga team Brøndby in the 2007–08 season under manager Tom Køhlert. He played half of the matches that season but had to withdraw later on due to injury.

Following his recovery from injury Wass secured his place as right defender in the 2008–09 season playing in 28 games from a possible 33, helping Brøndby to reach third place in the Superliga, Brøndby's best position since their second place in the 2005–06 season.

Brøndby manager Kent Nielsen felt Wass should spend gain further developing at another club, so Brøndby chose to loan him out to Fredrikstad, a medal-competing side from Norway. On 21 August 2009, Wass made his debut in a 4–1 loss against Rosenborg and on 1 November 2009, Wass started and played the full 90 minutes scoring in a 5–0 win over Lyn. When the board of Fredrikstad FK signed a new manager, new coach Tom Nordlie informed Wass that he had no interest in an offensive right defender. As a result of that, Wass received no more than three games before returning to Brøndby in December 2009. For the remainder of the 2009–10 season, Wass played more games for Brøndby, securing his place in the starting eleven.

The season of 2010–11 proved to show Wass' importance for the Brøndby squad when he was selected as first-choice right back for the first 19 games. In February, during the three-month winter break in the Superliga between December and March, Wass announced he would not be renewing his contract with Brøndby. From the beginning of January there had been rumours of Wass' summer transfer to Benfica. Wass did not comment on the rumours. In March 2011, with 14 matches of the season remaining, the attacking force of Wass was recognised, with Coach Henrik Jensen subsequently pushing the player up to right midfielder/winger. In his final matches for the club, Wass scored three goals, helping Brøndby to gain their third successive third place.

Transfer to Benfica and loan to Évian
On 20 May 2011, Wass announced that he had signed a five-year contract with Benfica. However, on 22 July 2011, he was loaned out to Evian Thonon Gaillard F.C. without taking part in any official games for Benfica. Upon moving to Evian, Wass joined Danish countrymen Stephan Andersen, Christian Poulsen and Thomas Kahlenberg. In the four months after joining Evian, Wass was kept out of the first team under Bernard Casoni, who preferred Brice Dja Djédjé, while Wass stated his intention to return to his parent club. On 15 October 2011, he made his debut, playing in right midfield, making an impact when he provided assist for Yannick Sagbo in a 2–1 loss against Saint-Étienne. Several weeks later, Wass scored in two consecutive games against Lorient and Rennes. He scored his third goal of the season in a 2–1 loss against Toulouse. Under new manager Pablo Correa, who succeeded Casoni, Wass secured a place in the first team, mostly being used as left-back, with Sidney Govou taking his former position in right midfield. After months of being kept out of the first team, he returned again, playing in left-back, due to Fabrice Ehret. Wass kept his place in the first team towards the end of the season when Guillaume Lacour took his position as left back, this time returning to the right midfield position. Two games before the end of the season, Wass scored his fourth goal in a 2–1 win over Ajaccio.

Transfer to Évian
On 20 June 2012, Wass signed with Evian on a permanent basis for a €2.5 million transfer fee. On 12 August 2012, in the opening game of the season against Bordeaux, Wass scored a free kick in a match that ended in a 2–3 loss for Evian. Like in the previous season, Wass played in various positions in defence and midfield. On 26 January 2013, Wass scored a further goal against Ajaccio in a 1–1 draw.

Celta Vigo

On 22 June 2015, Wass joined Celta Vigo on a four-year contract.

Wass scored a goal and assisted another in a 2–2 draw against Real Madrid.

Valencia
On 10 July 2018, Wass joined Valencia on a four-year deal for a fee reported to be €6 million. He made his debut for the club on 20 August in La Liga, providing an assist to Rodrigo's equaliser in a 1–1 home draw against Atlético Madrid. His first goal for Los che came on 14 April 2019 in a 3–1 away win against Villarreal in the UEFA Europa League. Wass was a starter in the 2019 Copa del Rey Final which saw Valencia lift the trophy after a 2–1 victory against Barcelona, his first ever career title.

On 27 November 2019, Wass scored on an overcooked cross from a tight angle, which surprised goalkeeper Kepa Arrizabalaga and knocked Chelsea out of the UEFA Champions League. The match finished 2–2.

Atlético Madrid
On 27 January 2022, Atlético Madrid announced the signing of Wass on a contract until 2023. He made his competitive debut for the club on 6 February, coming off the bench at half-time for Šime Vrsaljko in a 4–2 loss away against Barcelona at Camp Nou. The appearance would remain his only one for the Colchoneros, as he suffered a season-ending knee injury after a challenge by Ferran Torres.

Return to Brøndby
On 12 August 2022, Wass returned to Brøndby on a permanent transfer. He made his return debut two days later in a Superliga match against OB, starting at right-back in a 2–0 home win.

International career
Wass made his Danish international debut against England on 9 February 2011.

In May 2018, Wass was named in Denmark's preliminary 35-man squad for the 2018 World Cup in Russia. However, he did not make the final 23.

Personal life
Wass is the cousin of Nicki Bille Nielsen.

He has invested in the digital platform InchByInch.

Career statistics

Club

International

Scores and results list Denmark's goal tally first, score column indicates score after each Wass goal.

Honours
Valencia
Copa del Rey: 2018–19

References

External links

 
 
 
 
 
 

1989 births
Living people
People from Gladsaxe Municipality
Danish men's footballers
Association football wingers
Association football utility players
Danish Superliga players
BK Avarta players
Brøndby IF players
Eliteserien players
Fredrikstad FK players
S.L. Benfica footballers
Ligue 1 players
Thonon Evian Grand Genève F.C. players
La Liga players
RC Celta de Vigo players
Valencia CF players
Atlético Madrid footballers
Danish expatriate men's footballers
Danish expatriate sportspeople in Norway
Danish expatriate sportspeople in Portugal
Danish expatriate sportspeople in France
Danish expatriate sportspeople in Spain
Expatriate footballers in Norway
Expatriate footballers in Portugal
Expatriate footballers in France
Expatriate footballers in Spain
Denmark youth international footballers
Denmark under-21 international footballers
Denmark international footballers
UEFA Euro 2012 players
UEFA Euro 2020 players
2022 FIFA World Cup players
Sportspeople from the Capital Region of Denmark